Upward continuation is a method used in oil exploration and geophysics to estimate the values of a gravitational or magnetic field by using measurements at a lower elevation and extrapolating upward, assuming continuity. This technique is commonly used to merge different measurements to a common level so as to reduce scatter and allow for easier analysis.

See also
Petroleum geology

References
Upward Continuation in Schlumberger's Oilfield Glossary
Downward Continuation in Schlumberger's Oilfield Glossary

Geophysics
Petroleum geology